This article describes the group stage of the 2017–18 Women's EHF Cup, a women's handball competition.

Draw
The draw was held on 23 November 2017.

Seedings
The seedings were announced on 23 November 2017.

Groups
The matchdays were 5–7 January, 12–14 January, 20–21 January, 27–28 January, 3–4 February and 10–11 February 2018.

Group A

Group B

Group C

Group D

References

Women's EHF Cup seasons
group stage